Dongshaoqu Town is a town located in the Miyun District of Beijing, China. It is located within a valley, and surrounded by mountains in all four directions. The town borders Jugezhuang Town to the north, Dahuashan and Liujiadian Towns to the east, Yukou and Longwantun Towns to the south, as well as Mulin and Henanzhai Towns to the west. There are 9,495 inhabitants under its administration as of 2020.

History

Administrative divisions 
Below is a list of the16 subdivisions, more specifically 2 communities and 14 villages, that constituted Dongshaoqu Town in 2021:

Transportation 
Misan Road passes through the eastern portion of the town.

Gallery

See also 
 List of township-level divisions of Beijing

References

Miyun District
Towns in Beijing